Try Me may refer to:

Albums
Try Me!, an album by James Brown and The Famous Flames
Try Me (Rosie Gaines album), 1994
Try Me (Self Defense Family album), 2014

Songs
"Try Me" (Dej Loaf song), 2014
"Try Me" (DJ Snake song), 2019
"Try Me" (James Brown song), 1958
"Try Me" (Jasmine Guy song), 1990
"Try Me" (Jason Derulo song), featuring Jennifer Lopez and Matoma, 2015
"Try Me" (John Entwistle song), 1981
"Try Me" (The Weeknd song), 2018
"Try Me (Watashi wo Shinjite)", the fifth single by Namie Amuro with Super Monkey's
"Try Me", by The Grass Roots on their album Powers of the Night, 1982
"Try Me", by McLean
"Try Me", by UFO on their album Lights Out, 1977
"Try Me", by Plastic Toy and DJ Snake from the latter's album Carte Blanche, 2019

Other
Try Me Records, a record label founded by James Brown

See also
Try (disambiguation)
"Try to Find Me", a song by Gorky Park, 1989